"Detox" is a song by American rapper Lil Baby, released through album through Quality Control Music, Motown, Universal Music Group on September 2, 2022, as a single.  In the United States, the song entered at number 25 on the Billboard Hot 100. The song was intended as the lead single for his then-untitled third studio album, eventually released as It's Only Me in October 2022.

Charts

References

2022 songs
2022 singles
Lil Baby songs
Motown singles
Songs written by Lil Baby
Universal Music Group singles